Microdaphne indohystrix is an extinct species of sea snail, a marine gastropod mollusk in the family Raphitomidae.

Description
The length of the shell attains 1.8 mm, its diameter 0.8 mm.

Distribution
Fossils of this species were found in Early Miocene strata of the Burdigalian in the Warkalli Formation, Kerala State, India.

References

External links
 Harzhauser, Mathias. "A seagrass-associated Early Miocene Indo-Pacific gastropod fauna from South West India (Kerala)." Palaeontographica Abteilung A 1.6 (2014): 73-178.

indohystrix
Gastropods described in 2014